The Saganash River (Official name in ) is a river in Cochrane District in northeastern Ontario, Canada. It is in the James Bay drainage basin, and is a right tributary of the Kapuskasing River.

Course
The river begins at the north end of Saganash Lake in geographic Staples Township, and flows north, takes in the right tributary Staples Creek, and enters geographic Sulman Township. It turns northeast, takes in the right tributary Little Saganash River, and passes through the northwest corner of geographic Swanson Township into geographic O'Brien Township. The final  middle of the river forms the border between O'Brien Township and the Town of Kapuskasing, after which the river reaches its mouth at the Kapuskasing River. The Kapuskasing River flows via the Mattagami River and the Moose River to James Bay.

Tributaries
Hennessy Creek (right)
Wabicock Creek (right)
Grass Creek (right)
Young Creek (right)
Little Saganash River (right)
Staples Creek (right)

References

Sources

Rivers of Cochrane District